Neuhausen auf den Fildern is a municipality in the district of Esslingen in Baden-Württemberg in southern Germany. It is located 13 km southeast of Stuttgart. It is the birthplace of the Fortepiano builder Anton Walter.

References

Esslingen (district)
Württemberg